The 41st César Awards ceremony, presented by the Académie des Arts et Techniques du Cinéma, was held on 26 February 2016, at the Théâtre du Châtelet in Paris to honour the best French films of 2015. The ceremony was presided by Claude Lelouch, with Florence Foresti hosting the ceremony for the first time.

The nominations were announced on 27 January 2016 by Academy president Alain Terzian and awards ceremony host Florence Foresti. Marguerite and My Golden Days tied for the most nominations with eleven each.

In related events, the César & Techniques 2016 ceremony was held on 4 January 2016. On 22 February 2016, in a ceremony at the Hôtel George-V, the Prix Daniel Toscan du Plantier for producers of the year went to Pascal Caucheteux and Grégoire Sorlat of Why Not Productions (My Golden Days, Dheepan, The Sweet Escape and The Price of Fame).

Mustang and Marguerite won four awards each. Other films with multiple awards include Fatima with three, and Standing Tall with two, with the former film winning the Best Film honour.

Winners and nominees

Performer

Multiple nominations and awards 

The following films received multiple nominations:

The following films received multiple awards:

Viewers
The show was followed by 2.5 million viewers. This corresponds to 11.9% of the audience.

See also
 21st Lumières Awards
 6th Magritte Awards
 28th European Film Awards
 88th Academy Awards
 69th British Academy Film Awards

References

External links

 Official website
 

2016
2016 in French cinema
2016 film awards